Second-seeded Pauline Betz defeated first-seeded Louise Brough 4–6, 6–1, 6–4 in the final to win the women's singles tennis title at the 1942 U.S. National Championships.

Seeds
The eight seeded U.S. players are listed below. Sarah Palfrey Cooke is the champion; others show in brackets the round in which they were eliminated.

  Louise Brough (finalist)
  Pauline Betz (champion)
  Margaret Osborne (semifinals)
  Helen Bernhard (semifinals)
  Mary Arnold (quarterfinals)
  Patricia Canning Todd (second round)
  Doris Hart (quarterfinals)
  Helen Rihbany (quarterfinals)

Draw

Final eight

References

1942
1942 in women's tennis
1942 in American women's sports
Women's Singles